Payjack Chevrolet Building is a historic automobile dealership located at Medina in Orleans County, New York. It was built in 1949, and is a one-story concrete building. It is intact example of car dealership facility built to General Motors international standards of that era.

It was listed on the National Register of Historic Places in 2012.

References

Commercial buildings on the National Register of Historic Places in New York (state)
Commercial buildings completed in 1949
Buildings and structures in Orleans County, New York
National Register of Historic Places in Orleans County, New York
Auto dealerships on the National Register of Historic Places
Chevrolet